The January 1987 snowfall (also known as the Big Freeze of 1987) was a very heavy lake-effect type snow event that affected the United Kingdom, mainly the areas of East Anglia, South-East England and London between 11 and 14 January and was the heaviest snowfall to fall in that part of the United Kingdom since the winter of 1981/82.

United Kingdom

Parts of West Cornwall also had heavy falls. Several towns were cut off due to the heavy snowfall including the Isle of Sheppey which needed airlifts during the height of the storm.

This was due to a high pressure system over Siberia that moved into Scandinavia which in turn dragged a strong easterly airflow and brought very cold temperatures across Europe and the United Kingdom.  A low pressure system over Italy caused the airflow to drag the very cold air from Siberia to Western Europe and picked up further moisture from the North Sea which produced the heavy snowfall.  This caused serious disruption of transport in the area including the cancellation of many train services and the closure of many roads and railway lines.  Motoring organisations had to deal with more than 4000 car breakdowns and 500 schools were forced to close.  The extreme cold even affected the chiming hammer of Big Ben and at Southend-on-Sea the sea froze over.

The cold spell lasted from the 7th to the 20th, and was probably the most intense of the twentieth century. Temperatures stayed well below freezing on many days.

Ireland
In Ireland, the amount of snowfall was far less pronounced, but had a similar weather pattern to the United Kingdom. The amount of snowfall was greater in areas further inland than coastal areas.

At Roches Point  of snow was reported, and is the highest depth of snow since snow observations began at Roches Point since 1961. It's also likely that this figure marks the coldest temperature during the cold wave.

See also

 Winter of 1990–91 in Western Europe

References

External links 
 

1987 in England
1987 in Ireland
1987 cold waves
1987
Cold waves in the United Kingdom
Winter weather events in Ireland
January 1987 events in the United Kingdom